Zhuoshui is a railway station on the Taiwan Railways Administration Jiji line located in Mingjian Township, Nantou County, Taiwan.

History
The station was opened on 14 January 1922.

See also
 List of railway stations in Taiwan

References

External links

1922 establishments in Taiwan
Railway stations in Nantou County
Railway stations opened in 1922
Railway stations served by Taiwan Railways Administration